The Fall of Fujimori is a 2005 documentary film about Peruvian President Alberto Fujimori, who fled the country for Japan in 2000 to avoid facing 21 charges of corruption, murder and human rights abuses. Then, five years later, Fujimori flew into Chile and declared his intention of once again running for president in 2006. He was promptly arrested.

The Fall of Fujimori was produced and directed by Ellen Perry and aired on PBS as part of its Point of View series in 2006. It has been met with high critical acclaim, and received a 92% "Fresh" rating on Rotten Tomatoes. The film was nominated for Best Documentary Screenplay from the Writers Guild of America.

References

External links
 Official Site
 The Fall of Fujimori on IMDb
 The Fall of Fujimori on Rotten Tomatoes
 The New York Times review
 P.O.V. The Fall of Fujimori - PBS's site dedicated to the film

2005 films
POV (TV series) films
Documentary films about politicians
Political history of Peru
2000s English-language films
2000s American films